Yuji Ito  is a Japanese mixed martial artist. He competed in the Lightweight division.

Mixed martial arts record

|-
| Win
| align=center| 5-4-3
| Yasunori Okuda
| TKO (retirement)
| Shooto - Shooto
| 
| align=center| 2
| align=center| 3:00
| Tokyo, Japan
| 
|-
| Draw
| align=center| 4-4-3
| Yasuto Sekishima
| Draw
| Shooto - Shooto
| 
| align=center| 5
| align=center| 3:00
| Tokyo, Japan
| 
|-
| Win
| align=center| 4-4-2
| Takashi Ishizaki
| Submission (kimura)
| Shooto - Shooto
| 
| align=center| 1
| align=center| 2:11
| Tokyo, Japan
| 
|-
| Win
| align=center| 3-4-2
| Tomonori Ohara
| Decision (unanimous)
| Shooto - Shooto
| 
| align=center| 5
| align=center| 3:00
| Tokyo, Japan
| 
|-
| Loss
| align=center| 2-4-2
| Tomohiro Tanaka
| KO (punch)
| Shooto - Shooto
| 
| align=center| 1
| align=center| 0:00
| Tokyo, Japan
| 
|-
| Loss
| align=center| 2-3-2
| Kenji Kawaguchi
| KO (punches)
| Shooto - Shooto
| 
| align=center| 3
| align=center| 0:37
| Tokyo, Japan
| 
|-
| Draw
| align=center| 2-2-2
| Naoki Sakurada
| Draw
| Shooto - Shooto
| 
| align=center| 5
| align=center| 3:00
| Tokyo, Japan
| 
|-
| Win
| align=center| 2-2-1
| Takashi Tojo
| Submission (kimura)
| Shooto - Shooto
| 
| align=center| 3
| align=center| 0:00
| Tokyo, Japan
| 
|-
| Win
| align=center| 1-2-1
| Yuichi Watanabe
| TKO (punches)
| Shooto - Shooto
| 
| align=center| 3
| align=center| 1:49
| Tokyo, Japan
| 
|-
| Loss
| align=center| 0-2-1
| Yasuto Sekishima
| Submission (armbar)
| Shooto - Shooto
| 
| align=center| 4
| align=center| 2:01
| Tokyo, Japan
| 
|-
| Draw
| align=center| 0-1-1
| Kenji Kawaguchi
| Draw
| Shooto - Shooto
| 
| align=center| 4
| align=center| 3:00
| Tokyo, Japan
| 
|-
| Loss
| align=center| 0-1
| Yuichi Watanabe
| Submission (armbar)
| Shooto - Shooto
| 
| align=center| 1
| align=center| 0:00
| Tokyo, Japan
|

See also
List of male mixed martial artists

References

External links
 
 Yuji Ito at mixedmartialarts.com

Japanese male mixed martial artists
Lightweight mixed martial artists
Living people
Year of birth missing (living people)